Chasok Tangnam is a festival of the Limbu people which falls on a full moon day of the month of Senchengla or the Mangsir month of the Nepali calendar.

References 

Nepalese culture
Kirat festivals
Festivals in Nepal
Limbu culture